The 2013–14 Southern Miss Golden Eagles men's basketball team represented the University of Southern Mississippi during the 2013–14 NCAA Division I men's basketball season. The Golden Eagles, led by second year head coach Donnie Tyndall, played their home games at Reed Green Coliseum and were members of Conference USA. They finished the season 29–7, 13–3 in C-USA play to finish in a four-way tie for the C-USA regular season championship. They advanced to the semifinals of the C-USA tournament where they lost to Louisiana Tech. They were invited to the National Invitation Tournament where they defeated Toledo and Missouri to advance to the quarterfinals where they lost to Minnesota.

In 2016, the NCAA vacated all 29 wins (including 13 conference wins) due to participation of academically ineligible players.

Roster

Schedule

|-
!colspan=9 style="background:#F1C500; color:#000000;"| Exhibition
 

|-
!colspan=9 style="background:#F1C500; color:#000000;"| Regular season

|-
!colspan=9 style="background:#F1C500; color:#000000;"| Conference USA tournament

|-
!colspan=9 style="background:#F1C500; color:#000000;"| NIT

References

Southern Miss Golden Eagles basketball seasons
Southern Miss
Southern Miss